Matthew Nelson Strazel (born 5 August 2002) is a French professional basketball player for AS Monaco of the LNB Pro A and EuroLeague.

Early life and youth career
On 21 February 2017, Strazel signed a contract to join the youth sections of ASVEL after starting his career with its partner club, Marne-la-Vallée. In the 2017–18 season, he split time between the club's under-18 team and with Espoirs Lyon in LNB Espoirs, the French under-21 league, where he came off the bench. In 2018–19, he became a regular Espoirs player, averaging 14.5 points, 4.7 assists and 3.8 rebounds per game. On 6 May 2019, Strazel scored 44 points for the U18 ASVEL in a 110–100 loss to U18 JL Bourg during the semifinals of the French U18 Championship.

Professional career
On 31 July 2019, when he was 16 years old, Strazel signed his first professional contract with ASVEL. He made his senior debut on 6 October, playing five minutes in an 85–76 win over Cholet. On 29 October, Strazel made his EuroLeague debut, scoring nine points with three three-pointers in 13 minutes to help defeat Baskonia, 66–63. On 10 March 2020, he scored a season-high 17 points in a 95–83 victory over Monaco. On 10 June 2020, Strazel signed a contract extension with the team until 2025, but left in 2022, when signing a three-year deal with AS Monaco on June 21, 2022.

References

External links
ASVEL profile

2002 births
Living people
AS Monaco Basket players
ASVEL Basket players
Basketball players from Paris
French men's basketball players
People from Bourg-la-Reine
Point guards
Sportspeople from Hauts-de-Seine